Falls City High School is a public high school located in Falls City, Texas (USA) and classified as a 2A school by the UIL.  It is part of the Falls City Independent School District located in northwest Karnes County.  In 2015, the school was rated "Met Standard" by the Texas Education Agency.

Athletics
The Falls City Beavers compete in these sports - 

Cross Country, Football, Basketball, Golf, Track, Softball & Baseball

State Titles
Football - 
2010(1A/D2)
Girls Track - 
1982(1A), 1984(1A)

State Finalist
Baseball - 
1980(1A)
Football - 
2013(1A/D2), 2021 (2A/D2)

References

External links
Falls City ISD

Schools in Karnes County, Texas
Public high schools in Texas
Public middle schools in Texas